The BYD F3 is a compact car that was produced by BYD and was one of the top selling compact cars in China. Production of the first generation model commenced in September 2005, and facelifts were done in 2014 and 2016 with a few variants spawned including the BYD F3DM hybrid version, and the larger and more premium BYD G3 and BYD L3. 

The second generation model was launched in 2012 as a more premium option called the Surui. The second generation model was sold alongside the first generation facelift models and spawned the more upmarket BYD Qin which later replaced the Surui and fits inline with the rest of the Dynasty series BYD models.

First generation (2005–2021)

The first generation BYD F3 commenced production in September 2005. The original F3 is powered by Mitsubishi's 4G-series four-cylinder engines for early models.

2014 facelift
In March 2014, the first generation BYD F3 was facelifted and started production that year alongside the second generation model. It was given a new grille, headlights, tail lights, bumpers, wheels and mirrors. It runs on a 1.5L four cylinder engine known as the BYD473QE producing 107 horsepower. This engine has been the signature for the F3 since 2011. A turbocharged 1.5L engine is also available as the BYD476ZQA producing 151 horsepower. Transmission choices for this model are 5 speed manual, 6 speed manual or a 6 speed automatic gearbox. The 1.5 liter turbo engine was discontinued in mid 2015.

2015 facelift L3 version 
The first generation BYD F3 received another facelift in 2016. The updated F3 is powered by the same 1.5 liter inline-four engine with 109hp, mated to a five-speed manual transmission or a six-speed automatic transmission. The facelift features redesigned front ends and rear ends.

Specification
The BYD F3 features a 4-cylinder, 1.5-liter, Mitsubishi Orion engine (4G15S) with distributor-less Bosch ignition and fuel injection. The vehicle boasts Euro 4 emissions standards. Fuel efficiency is rated at approx . A 1.6-liter Mitsubishi Orion engine (4G18) was standard. Engine output is  while fuel efficiency is rated at approx . The Mitsubishi engines were then replaced by new BYD engines from 2011 onwards. The transmission MaTriX is a 5-speed manual transmission. Three point safety belts, power steering, alloy wheels fitted with 195/60 R15 tires, 4-wheel ABS disk brake system as standard, LED tail lights, and halogen headlights.

Equipment
The BYD F3 owner can choose from 3 trim packages (GL-i,  GL-X, and GL- Xi).   All models come with standard equipment:  AC, AM/FM/CD/MP3 stereo, electric windows and mirrors. Optional equipment includes upgraded leather seats, 3rd brake-light, driver and passenger air bags, auxiliary front fog lights and upgraded audio / IVI (in vehicle infotainment). Color schemes are white, black, champagne, and red, with black being most common.

Derivatives
Derivatives of the BYD F3 include the BYD F3DM (dual mode, rechargeable  electric / gas rechargeable vehicle), BYD F3R (hatchback), BYD L3 (Evolved version), BYD G3 (Slightly larger version), and BYD Surui (Luxury version). In 2009, BYD introduced the G3 as an updated/upgraded compact class vehicle - however, the F3 will continue to be sold in domestic markets.

Marketing
In March 2011, BYD reduced prices on 5 of their vehicles to address slowing domestic PRC auto sales as government incentives and stimulus wind down.  The price reductions range from 5 to 15% of vehicle cost.  The price-reduced  models include the F0, F3, G3, F6.   Several new models are due out in 2011 including a Mini-van and a HUV/CUV vehicle.

In March 2011, a review of the BYD F3DM (dual mode electric and gas vehicle) was published in the NY Times news paper.  The author gave the BYD F3DM a solid, if rather utilitarian review.  The price point is reported to be approximately  after government incentives. Currently BYD is planning a dealer network in North America with the first retail outlet slated for Los Angeles, California.   5 other dealerships are expected initially.

In 2011-2013 BYD F3 was assembled in Russia, at TagAZ factory.

2020 return
The first generation F3 made a return for the 2020 model year with the only one trim level available known as the Classic version. The same 1.5 litre engine is standard known as the BYD473QF and is paired to a 5 speed manual gearbox and is priced at 44,900 yuan (6,360 USD - May 2020 exchange rate).

Second generation (2012–2018)

In April 2012, the second generation BYD F3 Plus, also called Su Rui, was launched at the Beijing Auto Show. During 2013, the BYD L3 was also introduced in several export markets as the New F3. Transmission choices are a 5 speed manual, 6 speed manual or 6 speed dual clutch gearbox.

2015 facelift
In February 2015, the F3 was facelifted again known as the "third generation" F3. The facelift included new headlights and tail lights, bumpers and a new dashboard available for the 2016 model year. It runs on the same 1.5 BYD473QE engine. The turbocharged engine was not available. Transmission are a 5 speed manual or 6 speed automatic gearbox.

As of 2019, the F3 is still sold on the market alongside the Surui and the E5 and currently uses the BYD473QE engine paired to a 5 speed manual and 6 speed automatic gearbox.

Discontinuation
The BYD F3 was discontinued in late 2021 due to decreasing sales and BYD switching its focus onto electric vehicles.

References

External links

F3
Compact cars
2000s cars
2010s cars
2020s cars
Cars introduced in 2005